Babyteeth is a 2012 play by the Australian playwright Rita Kalnejais. Richard Roxburgh announced that he was planning to direct a film version in 2015.

First production
Babyteeth was first produced by Belvoir at Belvoir St Theatre, Sydney, on 15 February 2012, with the following cast:

 Toby – Kathryn Beck
 Anna – Helen Buday
 Thuong – David Carreon / Sean Chu
 Gidon – Russell Dykstra
 Moses – Eamon Farren
 Henry – Greg Stone
 Milla – Sara West
 Director: Eamon Flack
 Set designer: Robert Cousins
 Costume designer: Alice Babidge
 Lighting designer: Niklas Pajanti
 Composer: Alan John
 Sound designer: Steve Francis
 Assistant director: Kit Brookman
 Fight choreographer: Scott Witt
 Stage manager: Luke McGettigan
 Assistant stage manager: Liz Astey

References

2012 plays
Australian plays